Admiral Nakhimov is the third battlecruiser of the Russian Navy's . The ship was originally commissioned into service with the Soviet Navy in the 1980s, known back then as Kalinin (Калинин), a name the ship kept until 1992 when it was renamed for Pavel Nakhimov. From 1997 Admiral Nakhimov is undergoing a repair and a refit to receive new and improved weaponry and had been scheduled to re-enter service with the Russian Navy in around 2022. The date for the ship's return to service is uncertain. In 2021 it was reported that the ship's return to service would be delayed until "at least" 2023 while in February 2022 it was reported that Sevmash CEO Mikhail Budnichenko noted that the warship was planned for delivery in 2022. Later in the year it was again reported that the vessel's return to service might be delayed as late as 2024, with this being eventually confirmed by the head of United Shipbuilding Corporation Alexei Rakhmanov.

Differences from lead ship

Kalinin was constructed differently from the lead ship of the class. On the forward part of the ship, the twin SS-N-14 ASW missile launcher was replaced with eight SA-N-9 surface-to-air missile vertical launchers (not installed). The forward 30 mm CIWS cannons were replaced by CADS-N-1. On the aft part, a single twin AK-130 130 mm gun, similar to the guns used on Slava and Sovremennyy, was used instead of two 100 mm guns. Near the flight deck, the 30 mm CIWS cannons were replaced by Kashtan CIWS and moved to the aft superstructure and replaced with eight SA-N-9 vertical launchers (not installed).

History
Kalinin was laid down on 17 May 1983 at Baltiysky Naval Shipyard, Leningrad, launched on 25 April 1986, commissioned on 30 December 1988. It joined the Northern Fleet on 21 April 1989 though GlobalSecurity noted the cruiser was a Pacific fleet unit. On 4 January 1991 she went on long voyage to the Mediterranean Sea. After the end of the Cold War the cruiser was rarely deployed and by 1999 it was permanently docked in Sevmash awaiting repairs.

Reactivation 

In 2006, a decision was made to modernize this ship instead of completing the construction of the submarine . Later in 2006, she was undergoing refit at Sevmash shipyard in Severodvinsk, but was reported finished ahead of schedule and was announced to again be in service with the Northern Fleet. However, later reports state that the cruiser has been docked at Sevmash since 1999 without any activity. On 30 October 2008, Russian Navy representatives of the Northern Fleet announced that the first modification on Admiral Nakhimov had been started and that the ship would re-join the Russian fleet by 2012. In November 2010 the director of Sevmash, Nikolai Kalistratov, repeated this statement confirming that the Russian government had appropriated money for Admiral Nakhimov to be repaired in 2011 (costing over 50 billion rubles.) However he also said that the funds were insufficient and more were needed to bring the ship back to active service. After finishing repairs, Admiral Nakhimov was reported as likely to join the Russian Pacific Fleet. However, by 2020 it was reported that she would remain with the Northern Fleet.

In December 2011 the Sevmash shipyard stated that the refit of the ship would not be finished until after 2012. According to Sevmash General-Director Andrei Dyachkov the repairs were stopped because it was senseless to continue without having determined the final variant of modernization.

Work on modernizing Admiral Nakhimov was resumed in January 2014 with the vessel being projected to rejoin the Russian Navy in 2018. Admiral Nakhimov is slated to carry 60 Zircon hypersonic anti-ship cruise missiles, Kalibr cruise missiles and a navalized variant of the S-400 (missile) SAM system, among other weapons. According to Sevmash as of 2 November 2015 work on removing the battlecruiser's old equipment had been completed, and work to install its replacement was about to be commenced.

In 2018, Aleksey Rakhimov, the head of the United Shipbuilding Corporation, stated that the end date of the reconstruction remained 2021 or 2022, but additional changes made by the Ministry of Defense had made would require an amendment to the contract or a new contract. Trials are due to begin in 2020. In September 2019, state news agency TASS quoted Russian deputy defense minister Alexsey Krivoruchko that "It will be the most powerful navy warship. We inspected the project, the ship is now about 50% ready. As was agreed with Sevmash shipyard, we expect to receive the ship in late 2022." as reported by Jane's.

She was relaunched in August 2020 and was then expected to start sea trials in about 2023. It is expected to receive 176 VLS tubes: 80 for anti-surface and 96 for anti-air warfare. In early 2022, Sevmash CEO, Mikhail Budnichenko, noted that weapons systems for the cruiser would include: the Fort-M (NATO reporting name: SA-N-6 Grumble) and Pantsyr-M (SA-22 Greyhound) air defense systems and Paket-NK and Otvet antisubmarine warfare weapons. It was also reported that the cruiser would potentially be armed with up to 60 3M22 Zircon hypersonic anti-ship missiles.

In January 2023, it was reported that the loading of fuel and work on the power supply had begun, and that ship testing would begin later in the year. In February 2023, the head of United Shipbuilding Corporation Alexei Rakhmanov confirmed that testing of the ship would begin later in the year, and that the vessel is expected to return to service in 2024.

References

External links

Kirov-class battlecruisers
Cold War cruisers of the Soviet Union
1986 ships
Nuclear ships of the Soviet Navy
Ships built at the Baltic Shipyard